Fayed, or Al-Fayed with the definite article al-, is a surname.  People with the name include:

Mohamed Al-Fayed (born 1929), Egyptian business magnate
Dodi Fayed (1955–1997), his son, died with Diana, Princess of Wales
Ayman al-Fayed (1965–2008), Palestinian militant
Guillermo Fayed (born 1985), French World Cup alpine ski racer and soldier
Omar Fayed, environmentalist and publisher
Rahman Fayed, writer

Places with this name include:

Fayed, a city in Egypt

See also

Arabic-language surnames